Bohol, officially the Province of Bohol, is an island province of the Philippines located in the Central Visayas region, consisting of the island itself and 75 minor surrounding islands. Its capital is Tagbilaran.

The province of Bohol is a first-class province divided into 3 congressional districts, comprising 1 component city and 47 municipalities.  It has 1,109 barangays.

The province is a popular tourist destination with its beaches and resorts. The Chocolate Hills, numerous mounds of brown-colored limestone formations, are the most popular attraction. The formations can be seen by land (climbing the highest point) or by air via ultralight air tours. Panglao Island, located just southwest of Tagbilaran, is famous for its diving locations and is routinely  listed as one of the top ten diving locations in the world. Numerous tourist resorts and dive centers dot the southern beaches. The Philippine tarsier, among the world's smallest primates, is indigenous to the island.

It was the home province of Carlos P. Garcia, the eighth president of the Republic of the Philippines (1957–1961) who was born in Talibon, Bohol.

The earthquake, which also hit southern Cebu, claimed 222 lives altogether and injured 374 people. It also destroyed or damaged a number of Bohol's heritage churches.

In 2017, the provincial government began initiating the nomination of the entire province to the UNESCO Global Geoparks Network.

Etymology
Bohol is ultimately derived from bo-ol, a kind of tree that flourished on the island. Similar to Nahuatl, the h in the middle was used to transcribe a glottal stop which is a common phoneme in the languages of the Philippines. The original name is survived through Bool, a town in Tagbilaran where Miguel Lopez de Legazpi supposedly landed.

History

Early history

In 1667, Father Francisco Combes, in his Historia de Mindanao, mentioned that at one time in their history, the people of the island of Panglao invaded mainland Bohol and subsequently imposing their economic and political dominance in the area. They considered the previous inhabitants of the islands as their slaves by reason of war, as witnessed for example by how Datu Pagbuaya, one of the rulers of Panglao, considered Datu Sikatuna as his vassal and relative. The invasion of mainland Bohol by the people of Panglao ushered the birth of the so-called Bohol "kingdom", also known as the "Dapitan Kingdom of Bohol". The Bohol "kingdom" prospered under the reign of the two brother rulers of Panglao - Datu Dailisan and Datu Pagbuaya, with trade links established with neighbouring Southeast Asian countries, particularly with the Sultanate of Ternate. The flourishing of trade in the Bohol "kingdom" is owed to its strategic location along the busy trading channels of Cebu and Butuan. For other countries such as Ternate to gain access to the busy trade ports of the Visayas, they need to first forge diplomatic ties with the Bohol "kingdom".

Relations between the Sultanate of Ternate and the province of Bohol soured when the Ternatan sultan learned the sad fate of his emissary and his men who were executed by the two ruling chieftains of Bohol as punishment for abusing one of the concubines. Thus, in 1563, the Ternatans attacked Bohol. Twenty joangas deceitfully posing as traders were sent by the sultan of Ternate to attack Bohol. Caught unaware, the inhabitants of Bohol could not defend themselves against the Ternatan raiders who were also equipped with sophisticated firearms like muskets and arquebuses, which the Boholanos saw for the first time. Such new weaponry were the result of the aid of the Portuguese to the Ternatan raid of Bohol. Many Boholanos lost their lives in this conflict, including that of Pagbuaya's brother Datu Dailisan. After the retaliatory Ternatan raid against Bohol, Datu Pagbuaya, who was left as the sole reigning chief of the island, decided to abandon mainland Bohol together with the rest of the freemen as they considered Bohol island unfortunate and accursed. They settled in the northern coast of the island of Mindanao, where they established the Dapitan settlement.

Bohol is derived from the word Bo-ho or Bo-ol. The island was the seat of the first international treaty of peace and unity between the native king Datu Sikatuna and Spanish conquistador Miguel López de Legazpi on March 16, 1565, through a blood compact alliance known today by many Filipinos as the Sandugo.

Spanish colonial period

The earliest significant contact of the island with Spain occurred in 1565. On March 25 (March 16 in the Julian calendar), a Spanish explorer named Miguel López de Legazpi arrived in Bohol seeking spices and gold. After convincing the native chieftains that they were not Portuguese (who raided the islands of Mactan in 1521), Legazpi made a peace pact with Datu Sikatuna. This pact was signified with a blood compact between the two men. This event, called the Sandugo ("one blood"), is celebrated in Bohol every year during the Sandugo Festival. The Sandugo or blood compact is also depicted on Bohol's provincial flag and the Bohol provincial seal.
Two significant revolts occurred in Bohol during the Spanish Era. One was the Tamblot Uprising in 1621, led by Tamblot, a babaylan or native priest. The other was the famous Dagohoy Rebellion, considered the longest in Philippine history. This rebellion was led by Francisco Dagohoy, also known as Francisco Sendrijas, from 1744 to 1829.

Politically, Bohol was administered as part of Cebu Province.  It was separated from Cebu on July 22, 1854, together with Siquijor. A census in 1879 found Bohol with a population of 253,103 distributed among 34 municipalities.

The culture of the Boholanos was influenced by Spain and Mexico during colonization. Many traditional dances, music, dishes and other aspects of the culture have considerable Hispanic influence.

U.S. intervention and occupation

After the United States defeated Spain in the Spanish–American War, the U.S. bought the entire Philippine islands. However, under the newly proclaimed independent government established by Gen. Emilio Aguinaldo, which was not recognized by the U.S., Bohol was governed as a Gobierno de Canton.

During the resulting Philippine–American War, American troops peacefully took over the island in March 1899. However, in January 1901, Pedro Sanson led 2,000 in rebellion, due to the harsh treatment imparted by these troops and the destruction they caused. General Hughes led a campaign of repression in October 1901, destroying a number of towns, and threatening in December 1901 to burn Tagbilaran if the rebels did not surrender. Pantaleon E. del Rosario then negotiated the rebel to surrender.

On March 10, 1917, the Americans made Bohol a separate province under Act No. 2711 (which also established most of the other Philippine provinces).

Japanese occupation and liberation

Japanese troops landed in Tagbilaran on May 17, 1942. Boholanos struggled in a guerrilla resistance against the Japanese forces. Bohol was later liberated by the local guerrillas and the Filipino and American troops who landed on April 11, 1945.

A plaque placed on the port of Tagbilaran commemorating the liberation reads:

The convoy taking the Filipino and American liberation forces to Bohol consisted of a flotilla of six landing ships (medium), six landing crafts (infantry), two landing crafts (support), and one . Upon arrival, the reinforced battalion combat team advanced rapidly to the east and northeast with the mission of destroying all hostile forces in Bohol. Motor patrols were immediately dispatched by Col. Considine, Task Force Commander, and combed the area to the north and east, approximately halfway across the island, but no enemies were found during the reconnaissance. Finally, an enemy group of undetermined strength was located to the north of Ginopolan in Valencia, near the Sierra-Bullones boundary.

By April 17 the Task Force was poised to strike in Ginopolan. The bulk of the Japanese force was destroyed and beaten in the ten days of action. Bohol was officially declared liberated on May 25, 1945, by Major General William H. Arnold, Commander of the American Division.  About this time, most officers and men of the Bohol Area Command had been processed by units of the Eighth United States Army.

On May 31, 1945, the Bohol Area Command was officially deactivated upon orders of Lt. General Robert L. Eichelberger, Commanding General of the Eighth United States Army, together with the regular and constable troops of the Philippine Commonwealth Army, Philippine Constabulary, and the Boholano guerrillas.

Recent history

2013 earthquake 

At 8:12 a.m. (PST) on October 15, 2013, the island province suffered a severe earthquake with a magnitude of 7.2 on the Richter scale. The quake was felt as far as Davao City, Mindanao. According to official reports by the National Disaster Risk Reduction and Management Council (NDRRMC), 57 people died in Bohol, and 104 were injured, The Great Wall of Bohol or "North Bohol Fault" is a reverse fault was discovered on 15, October 2013 during the "2013 Bohol earthquake", It became one of the tourist attractions in Bohol province 

It was the deadliest earthquake in the Philippines since the 7.8 magnitude 1990 Luzon earthquake. Earlier that same year, Bohol was struck by an earthquake (on February 8, 1990) with an epicentre almost exactly the same as in 2013, causing six fatalities and 200 injured. Several buildings were damaged and it caused a tsunami.

2017 terrorist attacks 
On April 12, 2017, 11  Abu Sayyaf Group (ASG) terrorists staged an attack on Bohol. Three soldiers, a police officer and at least 4 of the armed men, including their leader Abu Rami, were killed in the clashes that started at 5 am. Also killed were two Inabanga villagers, though it was not clear whether they were killed in the crossfire or executed by the cornered militants. Security officials relentlessly hunted down the remainder of the ASG who landed in Bohol from the hinterlands to a neighboring island in the province which ultimately led to the neutralization of Abu Asis, the last of the remaining bandits, in May. He was gunned down by police Special Weapons and Tactics operatives in Barangay Lawis, Calape while fighting it out to the end along with Ubayda. Despite their nefarious intents, all 11 ASG members killed in the intrusion were given proper burials under Muslim tradition.

The tourism industry in Bohol was negatively affected by the ASG militants' incursion on the island, though tour operators believe the industry can recover.

Geography
To the west of Bohol is Cebu, to the northeast is the island of Leyte and to the south, across the Bohol Sea, is Mindanao. The Cebu Strait separates Bohol from Cebu, and both island provinces share a common language, but Boholano retains a conscious distinction from Cebuano. Bohol's climate is generally dry, with maximum rainfall between the months of June and October. The interior is cooler than the coast.

Physical Features

The main island is surrounded by about 70 smaller islands, the largest of which are Panglao Island, facing Tagbilaran, in the southwest and Lapinig Island in the northeast.

The terrain of Bohol is basically rolling and hilly, and about half the island is covered in limestone. Near the outer areas of the island are low mountain ranges. The interior is a large plateau with irregular landforms.

Near Carmen, the Chocolate Hills are more than 1,200 uniformly cone-shaped hills named for the grass growing on the hills that turns brown in the summer, making the landscape look like chocolate mounds. They are hills made of limestone left over from coral reefs during the Ice Age when the island was submerged. The Chocolate Hills are considered one of Philippine's natural wonders and Bohol is often referred to as the Jewel of the Philippines. They appear on the provincial seal of Bohol.

Bohol has 114 springs, 172 creeks, and four main rivers that run through Bohol with a radial drainage pattern. The largest river, the Inabanga, runs in the northwestern part of the province; the Loboc River drains the center of the island to the mid-southern coast; the Abatan River runs in the southwest, and Ipil River in the north. The only natural lake in the province is Cabilao Island Lake, also called Lake Danao or Lanao, on Cabilao Island.

Numerous waterfalls and caves are scattered across the island, including MagAso Falls in Antequera. MagAso means smoke in the native tongue. The water is cool and often creates a mist in humid mornings which can hide the falls.

The Rajah Sikatuna Protected Landscape protects Bohol's largest remaining lowland forest and can be found in the island's southern portion near Bilar.

Rivers

List of rivers in  Bohol by length:
Inabanga River
Loboc River
Abatan River
Soom River

Islands

The 85 outlying islands surrounding mainland Bohol under the jurisdiction of the Bohol Provincial Government are:

 Bagatusan
 Bagong Banwa
 Balicasag
 Banacon
 Banbanon
 Bansaan
 Bantigue
 Basihan
 Batasan
 Bay Sa Owak
 Bilangbilangan
 Bonbon
 Bongan
 Bosaan
 Buabuahan
 Budlaan
 Budlanan
 Bugatusan
 Busalian
 Butan
 Cabilao
 Cabulan
 Cabantulan
 Cabgan
 Calangaman
 Cancostino
 Calituban
 Cataban
 Catang
 Catiil
 Cuaming
 Dumog
 Gakang
 Gaus
 Guindacpan
 Hambongan
 Hayaan
 Hingutanan
 Inanuran
 Jagoliao
 Jandayan
 Jao
 Juagdan
 Lamanok
 Lapinig (Bonoon)
 Lapinig Grande (Pitogo)
 Lapinig Chico (Tres Reyes)
 Limasoc
 Lumislis
 Mahaba
 Maagpit
 Mahanay
 Makaina
 Makalingao
 Malingin
 Mantatao Daku
 Mantatao Gamay
 Maomauan
 Maubay
 Macaboc
 Nasingin
 Nocnocan
 Pamasuan
 Pamilacan
 Pandanon
 Pandao
 Panga
 Pangangan
 Pangapasan
 Panglao
 Pinango
 Potohan
 Pungtud
 Saag
 Sagasa
 Sandingan
 Silo
 Tabangdio
 Tabaon
 Tambo
 Tangtaang
 Tilmobo
 Tintinan
 Tumok
 Ubay

Tarsier

In 1996 the Philippine Tarsier Foundation was established in Corella, Bohol in efforts to help conserve and protect tarsiers and their habitat. Forest and habitat sanctuaries have been created to ensure the safety of tarsiers while allowing visitors to roam and discover these miniature primates in their natural habitats.

The tarsier is the smallest living primate that exists in several South East Asian countries today. The Philippine tarsier, Tarsius syrichta, locally known as "mamag" in Boholano is near to threatened according to the IUCN Red List of Endangered Species. Adaptation to their large bulging eyes allows them to catch prey clearly at night, and with elongated limbs and fingers, leaping from tree to tree gives no limitation to the tarsier. Their brain is about the same size as their eyes. The connection between its eyes and brain serves a unique function to these animals which is important for their stability and balance. Tarsiers have incredible hearing abilities. They can hear a frequency of up to 91 kHz (kilohertz) and send sounds of 70 kHz.

Climate

From November to April, the northeast monsoon (amihan) prevails. Except for a rare shower, this is the mildest time of the year. The summer season from May to July brings higher temperatures and very humid days. From August to October is the southwest monsoon (habagat). The weather during this season is not very predictable, with weeks of calm weather alternating with rainy days. It can rain any day of the year, but a higher chance of heavy showers occurs from November to January.

Geologic formation 

The formation of the island of Bohol began during the Late Jurassic Period (about 160 to 145 million years ago). It was still submerged except for what is now Mt. Malibalibod in Ubay and its adjacent area in Alicia, Bohol. Approximately 66 million years ago, at the end of the Cretaceous Period, the northern portion of the island began to rise gradually. Volcanic activity during the time caused the deposition of numerous layers of volcanic rock in the region. Land mass increased and grew at the beginning of the Paleogene Period (about 60 million years ago). During this period, diorite, a form of igneous rock, was introduced into the Talibon area. Between the Eocene and Oligocene epochs, the island's development was halted for millions of years. At the beginning of the Miocene epoch (about 23 million years ago), the island's geologic evolution continued. The combination of uplift and volcanism resulted in the deposition of limestone and the expulsion of andesite, a form of volcanic rock. Only the eastern half of the island was above water during this time. Approximately 5 million years ago, the southeastern portion of the island began to emerge from the ocean. From the late Pliocene to the Pleistocene (approximately 3.6 to 1.8 million years ago), the rest of the once-submerged portion of the island of Bohol rose to the surface, giving the island its present form.

Demographics

According to the 2020 census, it has a population of 1,394,329.

Government

Legislative districts 
 Governor: Erico Aristotle C. Aumentado (NPC)
 Vice Governor: Dionisio Victor Balite (NPC)
19th Congress

List of Governors

Administrative divisions 

There are 47 municipalities, 1 component city, and 1,109 barangays in Bohol.

Economy

Tourism plays an increasing role in the island's economy. The Panglao Island International Airport is currently planned for Panglao, which houses the most-visited and accessible beaches in the province. Proponents of the scheme hope that the new airport will increase Bohol's reputation as an international tourist destination although the plan has been dogged by ongoing criticism.

Festivals

Sandugo (July 1–31)
Tagbilaran City Fiesta (May 1)
Raffia Festival (June 29–30) – Inabanga, Bohol
 Saulog Tagbilaran in honor to Saint Joseph the Worker
Bolibong Kingking (May 23–24) – Loboc, Bohol
Pana-ad sa Loboc (Holy Thursday & Good Friday) – Loboc
SidlaKasilak – Loon (Fiesta Week: August 30 – September 8)
Sambat Mascara y Regatta (1st Saturday of December) – Loay, Bohol
Suroy sa Musikero (December 25 February 25–2) – Loboc
Bohol Fiestas (month of May)
Ubi (January)
Tigum Bol-anon Tibuok Kalibutan or TBTK – "A gathering of Boholanos from different parts of the world and the name for such a grand event"
Hudyaka sa Panglao (August 27–28) Panglao, Bohol
Sinulog (3rd Saturday of January) – Valencia, Bohol
Dujan (3rd to last week of January) – Anda
 Sinuog Estokada (September 28–29) – Jagna
 Chocolate Hills – Carmen
 Alimango Festival – Mabini
 Humay– Candijay
 Guimbawan – Batuan
 Espadahan – San Miguel

Infrastructure

Airport

The province's main airport is the Bohol–Panglao International Airport on Panglao Island. It replaced Tagbilaran Airport in November 2018 and serves as the gateway to Panglao Island and the rest of mainland Bohol for domestic air travelers. The airport is officially classified as an international airport by the Civil Aviation Authority of the Philippines. Direct Bohol - Seoul-Incheon flight was inaugurated on June 22, 2017. It was previously served Chengdu - Bohol flights, but was halted in 2020 amid the pandemic.

Seaports

Port of Tubigon, the busiest among the smaller ports, offers more than ten daily round trips plying the Cebu-Bohol route, including fast-craft and roll-on/roll-off. Catagbacan Port in Loon serves the roll-on roll-off services between to Argao and Sibonga in Cebu. Port of Jagna offers service between Bohol to Opol, Cagayan de Oro, Camiguin (Balbagon and Benoni), and Nasipit with (with roll-on/roll-off) routes.

The port of Ubay is the province's gateway to Eastern Visayas which offers service round trips to Bato, Hilongos, and Maasin City. It also offers daily round trips to Cebu City. The second port of Ubay, the Tapal Wharf, located in barangay Tapal, caters the daily President Carlos P. Garcia-Bohol mainland routes.

The ports of Buenavista, Clarin, Getafe, and Talibon also offers daily round trips to Cebu. Other known commercial passenger seaports are located in Baclayon, Buen Unido, and Pres. Carlos P. Garcia.

Education

The literacy rate of the province of Bohol is high at 98%.

Institutions of Higher Learning are:

 Bohol Island State University (BISU)
 BISU Main Campus - Tagbilaran City
 BISU Main Campus - Bingag, Dauis Extension
 BISU Balilihan Campus
 BISU Bilar Campus
 BISU Candijay Campus
 BISU Calape Campus
 BISU Clarin Campus
 Holy Name University (HNU)
 Holy Spirit School of Tagbilaran (HSST)
 University of Bohol (UB)
 Tagbilaran City College (TCC)
 BIT International College (BIT-IC)
 Immaculate Heart of Mary Seminary
 Mater Dei College
 ACLC College of Tagbilaran
 PMI Colleges Bohol
 Bohol Northern Star Colleges
 Blessed Trinity College (BTC)
 Bohol Northwestern College
 Cristal e-College
 Colegio De Getafe
 Batuan Colleges Inc. (BCI)
 Buenavista Community College (BCC)
 Talibon Polytechnic College (TPC)
 Trinidad Municipal College (TMC)
 Asian Divine Light College
 Bohol College of Science and Technology
 Bohol International Learning College (BILC)
 Ubay Community College (UCC)

Media

Bohol has 2 major AM radio stations, DYRD and DYTR, both based in Tagbilaran City. Another AM radio station, DYZD, based in Ubay, is being operated by DYRD.  Both DYRD and DYTR also operate FM stations with the same names.  There are multiple weekly or twice weekly newspapers like Bohol Tribune (formerly Sunday Post), Bohol Times, Bohol Standard and Bohol Bantay Balita. These days, Bohol Chronicle is now a daily paper.  An online news website called Bohol News Daily aggregates news from various sources.

Notable personalities

Gallery

See also

 Awit sa Bohol - official hymn of the province of Bohol
 Boholano dialect
 Boholano people
 Diocese of Tagbilaran
 Diocese of Talibon
 Eskaya
 Eskayan language
 List of Bohol Churches
 List of Bohol flora and fauna
 List of Bohol-related topics

References

Sources

Further reading

External links
 Official website of the provincial government of Bohol
 Provincial Planning and Development Office of Bohol (includes provincial atlas)

 
Provinces of the Philippines
Provinces of Central Visayas
Island provinces of the Philippines
States and territories established in 1854
1854 establishments in the Philippines
Bohol Sea